The Continuity of Spirit is an album by jazz pianist Horace Silver, his fourth released on the Silverto label, featuring performances by Silver with Carl Saunders, Buddy Collette, Ray Pizzi, Ernie Watts, Don Menza, Bob Maize and Carl Burnett with the Los Angeles Modern String Orchestra conducted by William Henderson and vocals by Andy Bey, Maxine Waters, Julia Waters, and Chuck Niles.

Reception

The Allmusic review by Scott Yanow awarded the album 2 stars and states: "The Continuity of Spirit finds Silver paying tribute to Duke Ellington, W.C. Handy and Scott Joplin. The idea of using disc jockey Chuck Niles as 'the spirit of Duke Ellington' is pretty hokey and the original music owes little to Ellington, Handy or Joplin; everything is in Horace Silver's own style. But there are some swinging moments on this well-intentioned set."

Track listing 
All compositions and lyrics by Horace Silver
 "Message from the Maestro Part 1"
 "Message from the Maestro Part 2"
 "Message from the Maestro Part 3"
 "In Tribute Part 1"
 "In Tribute Part 2"
 "In Tribute Part 3"
 Recorded in New York City on March 25, 1985.

Personnel 
 Horace Silver - piano
 Carl Saunders - flugelhorn
 Buddy Collette, Ray Pizzi, Ernie Watts, Don Menza - flute
 Bob Maize - bass
 Carl Burnette - drums
 Andy Bey, Maxine Waters, Julia Waters - vocals
 Chuck Niles - narration
 Los Angeles Modern String Orchestra, William Henderson - conductor

References 

Horace Silver albums
Silverto Records albums
1985 albums